20 Camelopardalis (20 Cam) is a solitary star in the circumpolar constellation Camelopardalis. It has an apparent magnitude of 7.45, making it readily visible in binoculars but not to the naked eye. Due to its faintness, 20 Cam is one of the 220 Flamsteed stars without Bright Star Catalog designations.

20 Cam is a red clump giant star with a spectral classification of G8 II-III. It has 1.83 times the mass of the Sun and shines at 142 times the luminosity of the Sun from its enlarged photosphere at an effective temperature of 5,064 K, giving it a yellow glow. 20 Cam's metallicity – elements heavier than helium – is around solar level.

References 

Camelopardalis (constellation)
G-type bright giants
Camelopardalis, 20
Durchmusterung objects
036770
026426
G-type giants